Bhuthi is ward in Dakneshwori Municipality in Saptari District in the Sagarmatha Zone of south-eastern Nepal. At the time of the 2011 Nepal census it had a population of 4,016.

References 

 https://web.archive.org/web/20161221071232/http://cbs.gov.np/image/data/Population/VDC-Municipality%20in%20detail/VDC_Municipality.pdf.  Government of Nepal. National Planning Commission. November 2012.
 https://election.ekantipur.com/pradesh-2/district-saptari?lng=eng. Kantipur Newspaper
 https://thehimalayantimes.com/tag/saptari-election-results/. 
 https://web.archive.org/web/20180831065451/http://103.69.124.141/

Populated places in Saptari District